Redd Kross is an American rock band from Hawthorne, California, who had their roots in 1978 in a punk rock band called the Tourists, which was started by brothers Jeff and Steve McDonald while Steve was still in middle school. With the addition of friends Greg Hetson and John Stielow on drums, the band's first gig was opening for Black Flag. The band has since released seven albums and three EPs.

Career

Red Cross
In April 1979, the band had their first practice in the living room of original drummer, John Stielow's parent's living room.  The first song they played was 'Annette's Got the Hits'.  Other songs such as 'Cover Band', 'S&M Party' and 'I Hate My School' were also played that same first practice. They eventually changed the band name to Red Cross, which was allegedly inspired by the masturbation scene in the film The Exorcist. They soon began working on their 1980 debut self-titled EP.   Eventually, Hetson left to join the Circle Jerks (and later Bad Religion) and Reyes left for Black Flag. They appeared on the Posh Boy compilation The Siren, and then to complete the lineup on their first full-length album, Born Innocent, they assembled a revolving door of musicians including original drummer John Stielow. Full of the brothers' pop culture obsessions, Born Innocent featured odes to Linda Blair (who starred in a television movie of the same name), a cover of "Look on Up from the Bottom" by the Carrie Nations from Beyond the Valley of the Dolls, and Charles Manson (whose song "Cease to Exist" they covered). The album also contains nods to Jim and Tammy Faye Bakker, Tatum O'Neal, and Lita Ford. Not long after the release of the album, the group was threatened with a lawsuit from the International Red Cross and changed the spelling of their name to Redd Kross, allegedly being inspired by Redd Foxx.

Redd Kross
In 1984, Redd Kross returned with drummer Dave Peterson to record Teen Babes from Monsanto, an album featuring covers by Kiss, David Bowie, The Rolling Stones, and The Shangri-Las. In 1984, lead guitarist Robert Hecker joined the band, as they embarked on tour in support of Teen Babes from Monsanto. In that same year, they were featured on the soundtrack of Desperate Teenage Lovedolls with their cover of the Brady Bunch Kids''' "It's a Sunshine Day". Jeff and Steve appear in the movie, along with Robert in the sequel Lovedolls Superstar which the brothers co-wrote with Dave Markey and Jennifer Schwartz. Both movies are available now on DVD.

In 1985, drummer Roy McDonald (later of The Muffs and formerly of The Things, and no relation to the brothers) joined the band.

In 1987, Redd Kross released Neurotica, an album reportedly influenced by Saturday morning cartoons and breakfast cereal (one of the songs was called "Frosted Flake"). Although the album itself was successful, the band's label, Big Time Records folded. The band continued to tour during these years however, and in 1988, drummer Victor Indrizzo joined the band.

Tater Totz
As the Tater Totz, the McDonalds teamed with Pat Fear of White Flag and Michael Quercio from The Three O'Clock and released Alien Sleestaks from Brazil, the title a tribute to the series Land of the Lost. Another cover collection, it included songs originally by Queen and Yoko Ono, and featured a cover of The Beatles' "I've Just Seen a Face" with lead vocals by guest Danny Bonaduce. The second Tater Totz album, Sgt. Shonen's Exploding Plastic Eastman Band Request Mono! Stereo, was released in 1989, and included Cherie Currie of The Runaways, and Pat Smear. A third Tater Totz album was released called Tater Comes Alive. A side project, Anarchy 6 had two releases, Hardcore Lives! and a cassette-only album Live Like a Suicidal, and was featured in Lovedolls Superstar.

1990s

On February 20, 1990, Redd Kross appeared on Episode 2 of the cult Public-access television show "Decoupage"  with Summer Caprice.

In 1990, Redd Kross signed with Atlantic Records, releasing Third Eye, and appeared with David Cassidy in the film Spirit of '76, and issued several singles, including "Annie's Gone", which had some mild success on college radio. Former Red Hot Chili Peppers / future Pearl Jam drummer Jack Irons joined for the Third Eye tours, and appears in the promotional video for "Annie's Gone", which saw some light rotation on MTV. Brian Reitzell succeeded Irons as drummer in the band, and appears in the promotional video for "1976".

In 1991, Robert Hecker took leave from the band.

The album Phaseshifter was released in 1993, with new band members Eddie Kurdziel, Gere Fennelly, and Brian Reitzell. The videos for "Jimmy's Fantasy" and "Lady In The Front Row" were both shown on MTV's 120 Minutes. They toured on Phaseshifter for over a year, headlining their own shows as well as tours supporting The Lemonheads and The Spin Doctors in late 1993 and Stone Temple Pilots in 1994. In 1995, Jeff and his wife, Charlotte Caffey (from The Go-Go's), had a daughter named Astrid.

In 1997, Redd Kross released Show World, produced by Chris Shaw (who also produced albums for Weezer and Soul Asylum) and toured supporting The Presidents of the United States of America.  The band took an indefinite hiatus after the Show World tour, and their future was uncertain after the untimely death of guitarist Eddie Kurdziel on June 6, 1999.

2000s

On July 1, 2006, Redd Kross returned to the live stage after almost a decade's absence. The Neurotica-era line up of Jeff McDonald, Steven McDonald, Robert Hecker and Roy McDonald performed a career-spanning set at the REDCAT (Roy and Edna Disney/Cal Arts Theater) at Disney Hall in Los Angeles. The band has subsequently gone on to play at the Azkena Festival in Spain, the Detour Festival in Los Angeles, give a performance of their entire first EP in honor of Rodney Bingenheimer's being awarded a star on Hollywood Boulevard, and a set consisting of the entire Born Innocent album opening for Sonic Youth (who performed Daydream Nation) at the Greek Theater in Los Angeles. They toured Spain and England in January, 2007. They have played a number of one-off shows including Los Angeles, New York, Chicago, and San Francisco. In 2008 they played the Coachella Festival in Coachella, California; ATP vs Pitchfork festival in Sussex, England; and NXNE Festival in Toronto, Ontario.

 2010s 
In 2010, Redd Kross headlined the Turbo Rock Festival in Spain. In 2011, they headlined the POP Montreal Festival.

Redd Kross toured Australia as part of the Hoodoo Gurus' 30th Anniversary on the "Dig It Up" Festival concert series. Jason Shapiro of the band Celebrity Skin played guitar, sitting in for Robert Hecker on these dates. Shapiro currently records and tours as the band's lead guitarist.Researching the Blues was released on Merge Records on August 7, 2012. They also put out a split single and performing with the Melvins on December 31, 2012, on Amphetamine Reptile Records.

The band returned to Australia in March 2013, touring with Dinosaur Jr.

In June 2015, their EP Teen Babes From Monsanto was reissued as a limited edition (250) full-length 12-inch vinyl record; it sold out in 24 hours.

Dale Crover is currently the touring drummer of the band during their 2017 tours supporting The Melvins. As of November 2017, Crover joined the band full-time and is Redd Kross' drummer.

August 23, 2019 saw the release of the seventh album titled Beyond the Door on Merge Records. The albums included eight new songs and covers of  "The Party" from Blake Edwards 1968 film of the same name written by Henry Mancini and a version of Sparks 90's dance hit, "When Do I Get to Sing 'My Way'". The album featured appearances from Buzz Osborne, Gere Fennelly, and Josh Klinghoffer, and  composing credits for Anna Waronker and Kim Shattuck.

Also in 2019, Emmy Award-winning television comedy writer Andrew Reich, best known as an Executive Producer on Friends, was directing a documentary on the band called Born Innocent: The Redd Kross Story.

On June 26, 2020, the band reissued their debut EP on Merge Records.

Steven McDonald and Redd Kross were included in a feature article for the 25th anniversary of TapeOp magazine.

Side projects
Steve McDonald fronted the hardcore punk parody band Anarchy 6, which included three members from Sin 34, Mike Glass (guitar), Phil Newman (bass), and Dave Markey (drums). Using the pseudonyms Chemical Warfare (McDonald), Spike Geek (Glass), HC Skinner (Marmon), and Mark Davey (Markey), they released the studio album Hardcore Lives! in 1988, and a live album with cover songs Live Like a Suicide 1990.

The McDonald brothers collaborated with Astrid McDonald (Jeff's daughter with Charlotte Caffey, guitarist for The Go-Go's) and Anna Waronker (Steve's wife, frontwoman of That Dog) on a side project. Performing as Ze Malibu Kids, they released the album Sound It Out in 2002.

Soundtracks
Redd Kross songs appear on the soundtracks to Good Burger, PCU, Bordello of Blood, An American Werewolf in Paris, and Varsity Blues.  Their song "1976" plays over the end credits of the 1990 movie Spirit of '76. They contributed one song "It's a Scream" for the 2000 film Shriek If You Know What I Did Last Friday The Thirteenth but neither the soundtrack nor the song itself were ever released. The song "Uglier" was licensed and used in the film Hits by David Cross.

Discography
Albums

EPs
 Red Cross (Posh Boy) (1980)
 Teen Babes from Monsanto (Gasatanka) (1984)
 2500 Redd Kross Fans Can't Be Wrong (Sympathy for the Record Industry) (1993)

Compilations
 Hot Issue (Redd Kross Fashion Records) (2016)
 Oh Canada! Hot Issue Vol. 2: Show World Tour Live (Redd Kross Fashion Records) (2016)

DVDs
 Got Live If You Must (Bittersweet)(2008)
 A History Lesson Part 1 - Independent (2010)

Singles

Compilation appearances
 The Siren (Posh Boy) (1980)
 Includes the entire Red Cross EP
 Public Service EP (Smoke 7) (1981)
 Includes "Cease to Exist", "Everyday There's Someone New" and "Kill Someone You Hate"
 Hell Comes to Your House (Bemin Brain/Time Bomb) (1981)
 Includes "Puss 'n' Boots"
 American Youth Report (Invasion Records) (1982)
 Includes "Notes and Chords Mean Nothing to Me"
 Enigma Variations (Enigma/Virgin) (1985)
 Includes "Citadel"
 The Melting Pot  (SST) (1988)
 Billed as Revolution 409 performs covers of The Osmonds - Crazy Horses & The Sylvers, Boogie Fever.
 Billed as Ledd Kross performs a cover of Led Zeppelin - Stairway to Heaven
 The Spirit of 76 - Original Soundtrack (Rhino) (1991) 
 Includes "1976"
 Freedom of Choice: Yesterday's New Wave Hits as Performed by Today's Stars (City Slang/Caroline) (1992)
 Band covers The Go-Gos song "How Much More"
 Shared Vision – The Songs of the Beatles (Hammer and Lace/Mercury) (1993)
 Band covers Beatles song "It Won't Be Long"
 If I Were a Carpenter (A & M) (1994)
 Redd Kross performs a cover of "Yesterday Once More"
 Poptopia! Power Pop Classics of the '90s (Rhino) (1997)
 Includes "Lady in the Front Row"
 KISS Tribute in Japan'' (Mercury) (1998)
 With Kanako Nakayama, Redd Kross performs a cover of "Hard Luck Woman"

References

External links
Redd Kross official website
The Bubblegum Factory: Redd Kross Fan Page with bio, press info, gig posters, photos and complete discography.

 

Alternative rock groups from California
Musical groups from Los Angeles
American power pop groups
Hardcore punk groups from California
Musical groups established in 1980
Pop punk groups from California
Atlantic Records artists
Musicians from Hawthorne, California
Merge Records artists